James Clover was born in Oskaloosa, Iowa on April 13, 1938. An internationally known sculptor and consummate academician, he taught drawing and sculpture for 30 years. His work is almost exclusively steel or bronze constructions with various welding, paint, and burnishing treatments. The whimsical forms are often a riotous chaos of white geometric shapes that climb into the air. Several U.S. cities boast sculpture parks which host the work of Clover and, like Alexander Calder, Clover's creations are no strangers to college campuses. In 1998, a major Clover installation was completed by Emory University in Atlanta. He died on April 12, 2021.

Monumental Sculptures and Public Works

United States

Georgia

 The Blade,  1972, Nancy Guinn Memorial Library, Conyers
 Untitled, 1973, Frankie Allen Park, Atlanta
 Untitled, 1967, West End Performing Art Center, Atlanta
 The Wave, 1974, Emory University, Atlanta

Michigan

 Dancing Fish, 1993, Quarton Lake waterfall, Birmingham
 Dragon, Roger Miller, Grand Rapids
 Heaven and Earth, 1990, Grand Valley State University Campus, Allendale Charter Township
 The Lake's Edge, 1990, Grand Haven
 Looking to the Future, 1987, Grand Valley State University Campus, Allendale Charter Township
 The Marsh, 1986, Edgewater Plaza, St. Joseph
 The River's Edge, 1989, Grand Valley State Campus-Downtown, Grand Rapids
 Sculpture with Stars, 1992, Federal Square Park, Muskegon
 Study (Fish), 1991, Grand Valley State University Campus, Allendale Charter Township
 Untitled, 1987, Grand Valley State University Campus, Allendale Charter Township

Mississippi

 Jackson Sculpture, 1971, Mississippi Museum of Art, Jackson

Ohio

 Wind Wave, 1977, Marion Technical College, Marion, Ohio

References 

  Smithsonian Research Information System - James Clover

20th-century American sculptors
1938 births
Living people
Allendale, Michigan
People from Oskaloosa, Iowa
21st-century American sculptors